Bogdanowo refers to the following places in Poland:

 Bogdanowo, Oborniki County
 Bogdanowo, Wągrowiec County